Australian Chinese cuisine is a style of cooking developed by Australians of Chinese descent, who adapted dishes to satisfy local Anglo-Celtic tastes. Its roots can be traced to indentured Chinese who were brought to work as cooks in country pubs and sheep stations.

Migrant numbers exploded with the gold rushes of the 19th century. By 1890, a third of all cooks were Chinese. Historians believe exemptions for Chinese chefs under the White Australia policy led to the eventual spread of Chinese restaurants across suburbs and country towns.

Most early Chinese migrants were from Guangdong province, and so Cantonese cuisine became the chief influence, using locally available vegetables and more meat than was usual in traditional recipes. Later Chinese immigration, as well as increasingly adventurous domestic palates, have led to restaurants with more authentic dishes from a wider selection of provinces.

History 
Not until the Australian Gold Rushes did many Chinese immigrants move to the country. The gold rushes drew thousands of Chinese people, mostly from villages in Southern China - especially the Pearl River delta. In 1855, there were 11,493 Chinese arrivals in Melbourne, Victoria.

As gold was rare, and mining always a dangerous job, Chinese people started to do different jobs to earn a living. Many chose to open small grocery stores or fruit and vegetable-hawking businesses, enter the fishing and fish curing industry. or become market gardeners. Other Chinese immigrants decided to open restaurants that served traditional dishes.

Perhaps because the White Australia policy had an exemption for chefs, many Chinese immigrants and their families became chefs in Australia. By 1890, it was said that 33% of all the cooks in Australia were Chinese. Over time, these Chinese communities grew and established Chinatowns in several major cities around Australia, including Sydney (Chinatown, Sydney), Melbourne (Chinatown, Melbourne) and Brisbane (Chinatown, Brisbane) and as well as regional towns associated with the goldfields such as Cairns Chinatown.

Chinese cuisine in Australia 
Australian Chinese cuisine cooking styles were derived from the cooking styles of provinces such as Sichuan and Guangdong. Therefore, Chinese cuisine in Australia from the beginning were usually hot, spicy and numbing (Sichuan cuisine); and/or sweet and sour (Guangdong cuisine). During the first Gold Rush period, Chinese labourers were found working their second job at small food stores which were referred to as "cookhouses" to serve their own people. However, at this time, there was little accessibility towards traditional ingredients, especially vegetables such as bok choy and choy sum. As a result, after the White Australia policy was revoked, many Chinese migrants brought seeds from China and started to grow their own vegetables at home to increase the variety in Australia. 

Chinese food has been named as Australia's favourite cuisine according to Roy Morgan Research. However, despite its popularity, Australian Chinese cuisine still slightly differs to the authentic Chinese cuisine. One of the reason for this is due to the conflicts between Australian and Chinese people. In order for these Chinese restaurants to survive, Chinese chefs were expected to provide food that would not directly compete with that of white establishments, but would still suit Western tastes. As a result, many Australian Chinese restaurants have adjusted their food to better adapt to the Australians' appetites. For instance, traditional cuisines of China considers vegetables as a main dish; while Westerners only treat vegetables as side dishes. To better suit the local diners, Chinese restaurants offer more meat options on the menus.

Moreover, as Guangdong's cooking styles focusing on producing a fresh and tender taste, their cooking methods usually favor steaming and braising the most. However, to better adapt to the Australian palates, deep-fried and saucy Asian dishes have also been included in the new menus. These includes sweet and sour pork, sticky lemon chicken and dim sim. Inspired by the authentic Chinese style of dishes, dim sum, the dim sim or "dimmy" is developed by Chinese chef William Wing Young around 1945 in Melbourne. Dimsim is a dumpling with thick (crispy) skin filled with meat and is usually fried. It is normally mistaken for dim sum - small bite-sized portions of food served in small baskets which are usually cooked by the steaming method.

Another example showing the adaptation of the Chinese cuisine can be seen through how Matthew Chan has developed Peacock Gardens Restaurant into the symbol of Modern Australian Chinese cuisine. In an interview with News.com.au, Matthew said that back in the 70's, Australian customers are not yet familiar with dishes such as "chicken chop suey, san choy bow and beef and black bean". It was Matthew Chan who has introduced these dishes into Australia with a few Western twists. For example, with 'san choy bow', understanding that Australian people were not familiar with pigeon meat, Chan decided to change the main protein to pork and beef mince. Furthermore, many vegetables were also substituted: cabbage to celery; bamboo shoots to water chestnuts; and most notably how Western broccoli have been used more frequently instead of Chinese broccoli .

Furthermore, as the popularity of Chinese cuisine has been increasing steadily in Australia for the past century, unheard Chinese ingredients are now appearing in Australian kitchens more regularly. For instance, tofu - a dish that was not accepted in Australia has now been the main ingredient in many dishes served in the country. Tofu was discovered over 2000 years ago by the action of curdling soymilk and pressing those curds into blocks with different textures such as soft, firm and extra-firm. A well-known tofu dish that are normally served in Chinese restaurants around the country is Mapo Tofu.

However, on the other hand, some Australian Chinese dishes are actually inspired by Western cuisine, this includes the Wasabi Prawn. This dish was developed by Matthew Chan during a business trip to America "I got the idea from the Hilton's San Francisco Grill where they had mustard on roast beef. I tried to do mustard steak but it didn't work, so I tried it with prawns." In this dish, the prawns are coated with the tangy and creamy English mustard and are served with a side of deep-fried spinach leaves sprinkled with sugar to balance the mustard's sharp and strong flavours.

In short, most Chinese restaurants in Australia are designed to be able to cater both Chinese and non-Chinese customers. That being said, there are many items on the menu such as chicken liver, ox tongue, pig uteri and other dishes that can 'frighten' the Western customers. Furthermore, due to the growing population of Chinese people in Australia, there are more and more Australian Chinese restaurants that serve highly authentic tastes, and there is a wider variety of types of Chinese Restaurants. This has included a significant boom in Hong Kong(/Macau) Style Cafes, often serving mixed Cantonese-western dishes with HK-style coffee or tea. Taiwanese restaurants have also significantly increased, especially in the major cities.

Restaurants

Due to such large popularity, Chinese restaurants can be found in most suburbs and cities of Australia. However, the most concentrated locations of Chinese restaurants in Australia are identified as Chinatowns. Here, the dishes are normally prepared to cater for recent Asian immigrants, tourists as well as Western people with a larger variety of cuisine; including Anhui, Cantonese, Fujian, Shandong, Sichuan and others.

Chinese restaurants can also be serving food at different price points; as well as serving both traditional and modern Chinese food. For instance, Chinese restaurants which are found in food-courts normally provide food for customers with shoestring budget. For instance, in Haymarket, Sydney, inside Dixon House, there are many Chinese food stalls that serve affordable Chinese meals. Dixon House, opened in 1982, is one of the most well-known Chinatown food courts. According to Thang Ngo "[Dixon House] is still the most Chinese of the Chinatown food courts" The place now boasts restaurants such as Oriental Dumpling King and Sizzling and Hot Pot Kitchen, where customers can find meals that range from AU$10 - AU$20.

On the other hand, Chinese restaurants can also be very expensive. The Golden Century Seafood Restaurant, located in Sydney Chinatown, has become the symbol for Chinese luxurious dining. The restaurant was established in 1989 and is known for their 'from tank to plate' serving style. This serving style, according to presenter Gus Worland, has provided an assurance for the freshness of the ingredients. Signature dishes such as Braised Lobster with Ginger and Shallot as well as Braised Whole Abalone with Oyster Sauce can cost the customers around AU$300. Moreover, the reason why The Golden Century Seafood Restaurant has become very well-known is that the place has been hosting royalty, politicians and celebrities. For instance, former United States president, George W. Bush has been spotted eating Peking Duck; or well-known celebrities such as Rihanna and Lady Gaga have also been seen to enjoy seafood at the restaurant.

Australia also contains authentic restaurants which serves traditional styles as well as restaurants that serves contemporary Chinese cuisine. Authentic Chinese cuisine can be found in Supper Inn Chinese Restaurant. Supper Inn was established in the 1980s; the restaurant is located in the central business district of Melbourne.  The food served by Super Inn is described as classic Chinese/Cantonese food: "It is such a simple comfort to eat here, [the restaurant] serves quality consistent Cantonese food." Super Inn's signature dishes include chicken congee and BBQ Suckling Pig. These dishes have been around in China for thousands of years. Moreover, the restaurant is also famous for its late night food; the restaurant only decided to close at 2:30 am – every day.

On the contrary, there are also restaurants that decided to combine the authentic tastes Chinese cuisine with other cuisines around the world to create its own version of contemporary Chinese food. Mr Wong is an example of this. The restaurant was co-created by Dan Hong and Michael Lou. Mr Wong, described by Sydney Morning Herald as a "self-contained Chinatown in the middle of Sydney". The restaurant offers a customised menu with the utilisation of many foreign ingredients has changed Australian people's perspective on Chinese cuisine. Indeed, xiaolongbao, a type of Chinese steamed bun which usually has a minced pork filling has now been swapped with lobster and scallop. Furthermore, Mr Wong also offers a modern drinks menu with cocktails and house-made ginger beer clearly suggests its effort to change the customers' views on Chinese cuisine.

Dishes

Chinese dishes that have been adapted to Australian tastes include:

 Lemon chicken: consists of pieces of chicken meat that are normally deep-fried and coated with a sticky, sweet and sour lemon-flavoured sauce. Despite its lack of resemblance to authentic Chinese cuisine found in China, lemon chicken is very popular in Australian Chinese restaurants.
 Lettuce Wraps: also known as San Choy Bow is a well known Chinese dish where originally pigeon minces were wrapped inside a lettuce leaf. However, in Australia, the pigeon mince has been substituted with mainly pork minces. 
 Chicken Stir-fried: also known as Chicken Chop Suey; is a dish that consists of stir fried chicken meat in combination with a green vegetable. In Australia, vegetables can also be swapped for carrot, mushrooms and/or bean sprouts.
 Chow Sam See: is a dish invented by Matthew Chan. This dish includes shredded chicken, barbecued pork and Chinese mushroom being stir fried and later being served in a thin pancake. Matthew Chan said that this was his effort to recreate Peking Duck with less expensive ingredients. 
 Mustard Prawns: is a dish inspired by Western cuisine. The main ingredients include prawns, cooking wine, mustard and sweet and sour sauce.
 Dim Sim: is developed by Chinese chef William Wing Young around 1945 in Melbourne. Dim Sim is a dumpling with thick (crispy) skin filled with meat and is usually fried.
 Billy Kee Chicken: A dish that hails from Sydney's Chinatown in the 1950s. Named after local identity, Billy Kee, it consists of fried chicken or pork in a sauce made with red wine, worcestershire sauce, five spice, garlic and tomato sauce. 
 Ham and Chicken Roll: A appetiser dish made with chicken wrapped around ham and then coated and deep fried. Often accompanied by sweet and sour sauce on the side.
 Mango Pancakes: A staple dish of Yum Cha restaurants in Sydney since the 1980s. It consists of a thin Mango crepe filled with whipped cream and chunks of mango. 
Mongolian Lamb: A staple dish consisting of stir fried lamb pieces and spring onions cooked in a soy and hoisin based sauce. It is often served on a hot sizzling iron dish.
 Honey Chilli Chicken: Popularised from the Australian Women's Weekly Chinese Cooking Class cookbook originally published in 1978.
 Satay Combination: A dish served on a plate with a mix of beef, chicken and seafood. Often served with a bowl of lemon essence that is set alight in the middle of the dish.

See also
Yum cha
Fusion cuisine
American Chinese cuisine
Canadian Chinese cuisine
British Chinese cuisine
Australian cuisine

References 

 
Chinese cuisine
Australian cuisine